"Crossroads" is a song recorded by South Korean girl group GFriend for their eighth extended play 回:Labyrinth. The song was released as the title track of the EP on February 3, 2020 by Source Music. The Japanese single album 回:Labyrinth ~Crossroads~ was released on October 14, 2020 by King Records, including the Japanese versions of "Crossroads" and "Labyrinth".

Composition 

The song was written by Noh Jooh-wan and was produced by him and Lee Won-jong. They both already made other GFriend songs such as "Time for the Moon Night" and "Sunrise". It was described by Billboard's Tamar Herman, as a song which is "quintessentially GFriend with its melodic, string-oriented soaring synth-pop as the members sing about".

On November 9, 2020, the song was included in the group third studio album 回:Walpurgis Night.

Chart performance 
The song debuted and peaked at number 32 on the Gaon Digital Chart for the week ending February 7, 2020. The song also placed at number 4 on the componing Download Chart and number 63 the week of the release of the song on the componing Streaming Chart.

Music video 
The music video for the song was released on February 3, 2020, at the same moment as the EP. For the first time, it was uploaded on HYBE Labels' YouTube channel after that the company Big Hit Entertainment (now known as Hybe Corporation) acquired Source Music in July 2019.

Track listing 

 Download and streaming

 "Crossroads" – 3:22

 回:Labyrinth ~Crossroads~

 "Crossroads" (Japanese version) – 3:22
 "Labyrinth" (Japanese version) – 3:23

Accolades

Charts

Weekly charts

Monthly charts

Release history

See also 
 List of Music Bank Chart winners (2020)
 List of Inkigayo Chart winners (2020)
 List of M Countdown Chart winners (2020)

References 

2020 songs
2020 singles
GFriend songs
Korean-language songs
Kakao M singles
Music videos directed by Lumpens
Hybe Corporation singles